Russell Island is an uninhabited island of the Arctic Archipelago in the Qikiqtaaluk Region of Nunavut, Canada. It is located in the Parry Channel, separated from the northern tip of Prince of Wales Island by the narrow Baring Channel. The western third of the island is separated from the other two thirds by a narrow lake and its outlet.

William Edward Parry was the first European to sight the island in 1819.

Another, much smaller Russell Island lies off the northwest tip of Devon Island. A third one lies in the West Foxe Islands, in Hudson Strait, southwest of Alareak Island.

References

Further reading

 Green, David E. C.; The Late Quaternary History of Russell Island, N.W.T., Ottawa: National Library of Canada, 1988,

External links 
 Russell Island (Nunavut) in the Atlas of Canada - Toporama; Natural Resources Canada
 Russell Island (Nunavut) (off Devon Island) in the Atlas of Canada - Toporama; Natural Resources Canada
 Russell Island (Nunavut) (West Foxe Islands) in the Atlas of Canada - Toporama; Natural Resources Canada

Uninhabited islands of Qikiqtaaluk Region